Letters from the Big Man is a 2011 American science fiction drama film written and directed by Christopher Münch and starring Lily Rabe, Jason Butler Harner and Isaac C. Singleton Jr.

Cast
Lily Rabe
Jason Butler Harner
Isaac C. Singleton Jr.
Jim Cody Williams
Fiona Dourif
Don McManus
Karen Black

Reception
The film has an 86% rating on Rotten Tomatoes.  Roger Ebert awarded the film three stars.

Dennis Harvey of Variety gave the film a negative review, describing it as "distinctive, frustrating and somewhat bewildering."

References

External links
 
 

American science fiction drama films
Bigfoot films
2011 science fiction films
2011 films
2011 drama films
2010s English-language films
2010s American films